The 1958 European Rowing Championships were rowing championships held on Lake Malta in the city of Poznań in Poland. Men competed in all seven Olympic boat classes (M1x, M2x, M2-, M2+, M4-, M4+, M8+), and women entered in five boat classes (W1x, W2x, W4x+, W4+, W8+).

Medal summary – women's events

Medal summary – men's events

References

European Rowing Championships
Rowing
Rowing competitions in Poland
European Rowing Championships
Rowing
Sport in Poznań